Athanasios Moulakis (July 11, 1945 – July 18, 2015) was President Emeritus of the American University of Iraq - Sulaimani (AUI-S) and a former Acting President and Chief Academic Officer, Professor of Government at the American University of Afghanistan.

Life
Born in Athens, Greece in 1945, he taught political theory and the history of political thought at German universities, the London School of Economics and the European University Institute of Florence where he was Head of the department of political and social sciences. After engagements at UCSD, Harvard, and St. John's College he was named Herbst Professor of Humanities at the University of Colorado, Boulder. He was professor of public communication at the University of Italian Switzerland in Lugano before moving on to the American University of Afghanistan. His "Beyond Utility Liberal Education for a Technological Age" received the AAC&U's prize for best book on liberal education in 1995. Moulakis died in July 2015.

Academic career
Moulakis joined the American University of Afghanistan at the beginning of 2008. Previously, he was director of the Institute for Mediterranean Studies of the University of Lugano. Over an 11-year period Moulakis was Herbst Professor of Humanities and Professor of Political Science at the University of Colorado, where he was also founding Director of the Herbst Program of Humanities.

Moulakis has held other academic and administrative assignments at European and North American colleges, institutes, and universities. A partial list includes the European University Institute in Florence, where he served as head of the Department of Political and Social Sciences; a Fulbright professorship at the University of Jena, Germany; the London School of Economics; St. John's College, Annapolis; Harvard University; and the University of California, San Diego.

His publication list includes a large number of books and articles on topics in the humanities, political theory, public policy, higher education, international relations, and other scholarly fields. With a Dr.Phil. (magna cum laude) degree from the Ruhr-Universität Bochum, Moulakis has published and lectured in five languages.  He has received numerous academic honors and awards, including the American Association of Colleges and Universities’ prize for best book on liberal education.

Published works
 Simone Weil and the Politics of Self-Denial, Athanasios Moulakis, Translated from German by Ruth Hein, Publisher: University of Missouri Press Pub. Date: February 1998 
 History of Political Ideas: Hellenism, Rome, and Early Christianity, Vol. 1 by Athanasios Moulakis (Editor), Eric Voegelin, Athanasios Moulakis Publisher: University of Missouri Press Pub. Date: June 1997 
 Promise of History: Essays in Political Philosophy by Athanasios Moulakis (Editor) Publisher: Walter de Gruyter, Inc. Pub. Date: December 1985 
 Republican Realism in Renaissance Florence: Francesco Guicciardini's "Discorso di Logrogno" by Athanasios Moulakis, Francesco Guicciardini Publisher: Rowman & Littlefield Publishers, Inc. Pub. Date: May 1998 
 Beyond Utility: Liberal Education for a Technological Age by Athanasios Moulakis Publisher: University of Missouri Press Pub. Date: December 1993 
 Legitimacy/Legitimate: Proceedings of the Conference Held in Florence, June 3–4, 1982 (Publications of the European Univ Inst, Series C: Political) by Editor-Athanasios Moulakis Publisher: Walter de Gruyter Inc Date Published: 1986-07 
 Homonoia: Eintracht und Entwicklung eines politischen Bewusstseins Publisher: List Verlag, Pub.Date: Muenchen 1973

See also
Eric Voegelin
Ellis Sandoz
Eugene Webb
American philosophy
List of American philosophers

References

External links
 Order and History Vol 2 by Athanasios Moulakis 
 The American University of Afghanistan - Official website
 USAID/Afghanistan: Education Website

American political scientists
Greek philosophers
Greek political scientists
Writers from Athens
1945 births
2015 deaths
Academic staff of the University of Lugano
American University of Afghanistan
Academics of the London School of Economics
Academic staff of the European University Institute
University of Colorado Boulder faculty
University of California, San Diego faculty
Academic staff of the University of Jena
St. John's College (Annapolis/Santa Fe) faculty
Harvard University faculty
Heads of universities and colleges in Asia
Academic staff by university or college in Iraq